What You Want may refer to:

Songs
"What You Want" (Evanescence song), 2011
"What You Want" (Jay Sean song), 2017
"What You Want" (Mase song), 1998
What You Want (Belly song), 2018, featuring The Weeknd
"What You Want (Baby I Want You)", by The Music Explosion in 1968
"What You Want", by My Bloody Valentine from their 1991 album Loveless
"What You Want", by Nuno Bettencourt from his 1997 album Schizophonic
"What You Want", by The Wannadies from their 1997 album The Wannadies
"What You Want", from the musical Legally Blonde
"What You Want", by Mandy Moore from her 1999 album So Real
"What You Want", by The Roots from their 1999 live album The Roots Come Alive
"What You Want", by DMX, the alternate radio title of his 2000 single What These Bitches Want
"What You Want", by LL Cool J from his 2006 album Todd Smith
"What You Want", by Tenth Avenue North from their 2016 album Followers
"What You Want", by Richard Marx from his 1994 album Paid Vacation

Other
What You Want (EP), a 2004 EP by the John Butler Trio
"What You Want" (Danny Phantom), an episode of the television series Danny Phantom

See also
"What Ya Want", song by Eve
 Whatcha Want, album by Michael Monroe
 "So What'cha Want", single by Beastie Boys